Louis Huet Massue (November 3, 1828 – June 17, 1891) was a farmer, seigneur and political figure in Quebec. He represented Richelieu in the House of Commons of Canada from 1878 to 1887 as a Liberal-Conservative member.

He was born in Varennes, Lower Canada, the son of Aignan-Aimé Massue, seigneur  of Ste-Anne, and Celeste Richard. Massue was educated at the Collège Saint-Hyacinthe. In 1850, he married Esther Perrault. Massue was president of the Quebec Council of Agriculture. He owned the seigneuries of Trinité and St.-Michel. He died at Varennes at the age of 62.

References 
 
The Canadian parliamentary companion, 1883, JA Gemmill

1828 births
1891 deaths
Members of the House of Commons of Canada from Quebec
Conservative Party of Canada (1867–1942) MPs
People from Varennes, Quebec